Jason MacDonald (born April 1, 1974) is a Canadian former professional ice hockey winger, who played with the New York Rangers of the National Hockey League (NHL). MacDonald played with many AHL teams and served as the captain of the Wilkes-Barre Scranton Penguins.

Career statistics

Regular season and playoffs

External links

1974 births
Living people
Adirondack Red Wings players
Canadian ice hockey forwards
Detroit Red Wings draft picks
Fredericton Canadiens players
Hartford Wolf Pack players
Ice hockey people from Prince Edward Island
Manitoba Moose (IHL) players
New York Rangers players
North Bay Centennials players
Orlando Solar Bears (IHL) players
Owen Sound Platers players
Providence Bruins players
Saint John Flames players
St. John's Maple Leafs players
Sportspeople from Charlottetown
Toledo Storm players
Wilkes-Barre/Scranton Penguins players